Captain Oren John Rose, usually referred to as O. J. Rose (23 March 1892 – 21 June 1971) was a World War I flying ace credited with 16 aerial victories.

World War I
Rose joined the Royal Flying Corps in 1917. He went to France, and was assigned to 92 Squadron. Flying one of four different RAF SE.5as, he tallied up his victories between 30 July and 4 November 1918, becoming the top scoring ace of No. 92 Squadron RAF.

He tallied 14 enemy airplanes destroyed, including one shared with James Victor Gascoyne, and two "driven down out of control".

After World War I

In 1919, Rose fought in the Russian Civil War.

He returned to the US and went into business, becoming a car dealer in Marysville, Ohio.

During World War II, Rose joined the U.S. Army Air Corps as an operations and training officer in Kentucky. He moved on to a squadron command in Louisiana during 1943 and 1944. By the time he was discharged in 1946, Rose had become commander of the Aircraft Assignment Base at Wright Field.

He returned to his auto business, from which he retired in the 1960s.

Honors and awards
Distinguished Flying Cross (DFC)

Lieut. Oren John Rose. (FRANCE)

A very gallant officer who has accounted for nine enemy aeroplanes. On 29 September he observed an enemy scout attacking some of our machines; engaging it, he drove it down from 15,000 feet to 6,000 feet, when it fell in flames. On his return journey he attacked and destroyed an enemy two-seater.

Distinguished Flying Cross (DFC) Bar

Lt (A./Capt.) Oren John Rose, D.F.C. (FRANCE)

A brilliant and fearless leader who, since 9 October, has destroyed seven enemy aeroplanes. His personal example of skill and determination in aerial combats and in attacking troops and transport on the ground is of the greatest value in maintaining the high standard of efficiency in his squadron.

See also

 List of World War I flying aces from the United States

References

Bibliography
 SE 5/5a Aces of World War I. Norman Franks. Osprey Publishing, 2007. , 9781846031809.
 American Aces of World War 1 Harry Dempsey. Osprey Publishing, 2001. , .

1892 births
1971 deaths
American World War I flying aces
Aviators from Missouri